Two pack may refer to:

Collections of two objects of the same type
 Twopack (European Union law), two regulations to reform a part of the Stability and Growth Pact for eurozone member states
Media and entertainment
 2Pac, the artist name of the American rapper, actor, poet and activist Tupac Amaru Shakur (June 16, 1971 – September 13, 1996)